Magpie River may refer to:

Magpie River (Ontario) in Ontario, Canada
Magpie River (Quebec) in northern Quebec, Canada

See also 
 Magpie (disambiguation)